Škoda means pity in  the Czech and Slovak languages. It may also refer to:

Czech brands and enterprises
 Škoda Auto, automobile and previously bicycle manufacturer in Mladá Boleslav
 Škoda Motorsport, the division of Škoda Auto responsible for motorsport activities
 Škoda Transportation, engineering company that manufactures rail vehicles, based in Plzeň
 Škoda Works, engineering company, predecessor of Škoda Transportation
 Doosan Škoda Power, subsidiary of the Doosan Group, based in Plzeň

People
 Škoda (surname)
 Skoda (Portuguese footballer) (born 1960)

Art
 Škoda lásky, the original Czech title of the "Beer Barrel Polka"

Other
 British Rail Class 90, an electric locomotive nicknamed Skoda
 Skoda (barquentine), sailing vessel built in Kingsport, Nova Scotia, in 1893
 Skoda Xanthi F.C., former name of the Greek football club Xanthi F.C. (sponsored by Škoda Auto in 1991–2016)
 Skoda Xanthi Arena, former name of the club's stadium
 Skoda–El Mir theorem, theorem of complex geometry